Arada is a property development company based in Sharjah, in the United Arab Emirates.

History 

Arada is a privately held property development company, based in the United Arab Emirates, with an initial focus on the emirate of Sharjah. The company was founded in December 2016 by Sheikh Sultan bin Ahmed Al Qasimi, chairman of Basma Group, and Prince Khaled bin Alwaleed bin Talal Alsaud, chairman of KBW Investments. Arada has so far launched three master-planned communities with a total value of AED 33 billion, making it the largest developer in Sharjah.

Projects

Nasma Residences 

Launched in March 2017, Nasma Residences is a housing project in the Al Tay suburb of Sharjah. The project has sold out and the first five phases have been completed and handed over. Nasma Central, the project’s community centre and public park, was completed in 2021.

Aljada 

Launched in September 2017, Aljada is a large mixed-use development spread over a 24 million square foot area in the Muwaileh suburb of Sharjah. 

The masterplan for Aljada includes housing, a business park, shops, hotels and schools as well as a leisure and entertainment complex, which is being designed by Zaha Hadid Architects. 

Construction work on Aljada began in the first quarter of 2018, with the entire project scheduled for completion in 2025. 

In December 2017, Arada secured AED 1 billion in Islamic financing from two banks in the United Arab Emirates to help fund the development of the project. The company secured a further AED 1 billion in financing in 2019  with further funding valued at AED 337 million  and AED 250 million  finalised in 2021.

In April 2018, Arada signed a deal with Emaar Properties Hospitality Group to open three hotels in Aljada.

In February 2020, the first phase of the leisure entertainment complex, called Madar at Aljada, was opened to the public, marking the first part of the project to be completed.

The first homes at Aljada were completed and handed over at the beginning of 2021.

Masaar

In January 2021, Arada launched its third project, an upmarket forested community based in the Suyoh district of Sharjah. The project consists of 4,000 villas and townhouses, with the first phase due for completion by the end of 2022.

Anantara Sharjah Resort 
In December 2017, Arada announced that it would open Sharjah's first Anantara-branded hotel in conjunction with Basma Group. The Anantara Sharjah Resort will have 233 rooms.

References

External links 
 

Real estate companies of Saudi Arabia
Real estate companies established in 2016
Organisations based in Sharjah (city)
2016 establishments in Saudi Arabia